Beni Guecha may refer to:
Ben Guecha, a town in El Oued Province, Algeria
Yahia Beniguecha, a town in Mila Province, Algeria